Freeze the Fear with Wim Hof is a British reality television competition series presented by Holly Willoughby and Lee Mack. The series began broadcasting on BBC One on 12 April 2022.

The series follows eight celebrities who are trained by Dutch extreme athlete and motivational speaker Wim Hof, to complete a series of challenges in sub-zero temperatures that tests the participants both physically and mentally.

Production 
In August 2021, it was announced that the BBC had ordered a competition series by Wim Hof, to be presented by Holly Willoughby and Lee Mack. In March 2022, the series title Freeze the Fear with Wim Hof and the participants were announced.

The series is executive produced by Dan Baldwin for Hungry Bear Media, and is distributed by BBC Studios.

Cast

Main
 Wim Hof
 Holly Willoughby
 Lee Mack

Participants

 Alfie Boe – English tenor and actor
 Chelcee Grimes – English singer, songwriter, television presenter, and footballer.
 Dianne Buswell – Australian dancer
 Gabby Logan – English sport television presenter.
 Owain Wyn Evans – Welsh weather reporter
 Patrice Evra – French footballer
 Professor Green – English rapper
 Tamzin Outhwaite – English actress

Spin-off
In March 2022, it was announced that a spin-off show called Munya and Filly Get Chilly would be aired alongside the series, presented by Munya Chawawa and Yung Filly on BBC Three. The show features behind-the-scenes content and interviews with the presenters and the participants of the series.

References

External links
 
 
 

2022 British television series debuts
2020s British game shows
BBC high definition shows
English-language television shows
Television series by Hungry Bear Media